Museum of the Moon is a 2016 inflatable installation artwork by Luke Jerram. Several copies tour the world for temporary exhibitions, often accompanied by music. There are also copies in museums in Barcelona and Sydney.

Jerram was inspired to create an artwork of the Moon after observing the wide tidal range of a local waterway when he lived in Bristol. The helium balloon was made by Cameron Balloons, initially funded by the UK Association of Science and Discovery Centres and the UK Space Agency, using ripstop material coated with urethane. When installed in a dark place, the sphere is lit internally to create a glowing floating orb. Although the surface of the balloon is smooth, the fine detail of the imagery gives the impression that it is textured.

After six months of work, the artwork was first exhibited at the Bristol International Balloon Fiesta in June 2016, but high winds caused it to burst within a few minutes. It was quickly repaired and the original balloon and its reproductions have been exhibited many times since.

See also
 Moon Museum

References
 Museum of the Moon website
 Museum of the Moon, UK Association of Science and Discovery Centres
 Museum of the Moon, lukejerram.com
 Museum of the Moon, a new artwork by Luke Jerram, to be unveiled at Balloon Fiesta, 17 June 2016
 Lunar balloonist , nature.com, 21 June 2016
 Giant moon balloon goes out with a bang, BBC Newsround, 12 August 2016
 Kendal's Lakes Alive festival features lunar artwork, BBC News, 28 August 2016
 Giant moon hung at University of Bristol hall, BBC News, 19 March 2017
 Museum of the Moon comes to Glasgow, BBC News, 29 May 2018
 Moon artist Luke Jerram unveils giant Earth sculpture, BBC News, 20 July 2018

External links
 Why the Moon, Luke?, BBC Radio 4, 2 January 2018
 Why the Moon, Luke?, Seriously…, BBC Radio 4, 
 Museum of the Moon, vimeo.com

2016 works
Moon in art
Installation art works
Installation art works by Luke Jerram